Utøya: July 22, also known as U – July 22 (the title used at the 2018 Berlinale), is a 2018 Norwegian drama film directed by Erik Poppe and written by Anna Bache-Wiig and Siv Rajendram Eliassen. It is based on the Utøya summer camp massacre that took place on 22 July 2011, but the characters are fictional.

The purpose of Utøya: July 22 is to promote understanding of the victims by showing the massacre from their perspective. The film was created in close dialogue with over 40 survivors, to get the action as close to reality as possible. It was shot in a single take in real time, and follows the character Kaja from the third-person perspective before and throughout the 72-minute attack. The terrorist is a figure in the periphery throughout the film, and is only briefly seen two times.

Plot 

Kaja attends a Labour Party summer camp on Utøya with her younger sister Emilie. On 22 July, participants receive news that a bomb has exploded in the Government quarter in Oslo but believe they are safe as long as they are on an island, away from the city. Soon, gunshots are heard, and the campers quickly disperse as it becomes clear that it is not a drill.

At first, most campers attempt to hide in the camp's main building while loudly crying and screaming, but then they run away to the nearby forest. While hiding behind trees, Kaja and her friends call 112, and the police claim to be on the way. The others agree to run for the water so they can swim to safety, but Kaja runs back towards the camp to look for Emilie. Kaja finds a boy named Tobias, whom she convinces to run into the forest. When Kaja is unable to find Emilie in their tent, she runs back into the forest to find her.

Kaja comes across a young girl who has been shot and tries to comfort her. Smoke grenades fill the forest, and the girl dies just as her mother calls her. Kaja finds Magnus, a new camper she had met earlier in the day, with two other campers along the shoreline of the island. Magnus tries to defuse the situation and tell jokes to brighten the mood, but the other two do not take it lightly. Later, they see a large number of campers running in the lake, and the other two campers abandon Kaja and Magnus. Kaja and Magnus discuss what they want to be when they grow up; Kaja wants to be Norway's prime minister, and Magnus an actor.

After a close encounter with the shooter, Kaja goes out to find her sister again. Once on the beach, she discovers bodies scattered along the shoreline, including that of Tobias. As Magnus catches up to her, Kaja breaks down. A small boat is seen in the distance, and Magnus tries to convince Kaja to go with him, but she gets shot by the terrorist and falls to the ground. She cries out for Magnus and gets shot again, this time fatally. The perspective then switches to that of Magnus, as he runs for and reaches the boat with other survivors. As the boat sails away from the island, Magnus tearfully breaks down. It is revealed Emilie is also on the boat and is trying to help a seriously injured person. The screen turns to black.

We hear the boat reaching land, and the cries and screams of the survivors. A text-based epilogue then lists the number of casualties, and describes the terrorist's motivations. It ends with a warning that the far right is on the rise, and that there is growing support for the terrorist's political beliefs and enemy image.

Cast  

 Andrea Berntzen as Kaja
 Aleksander Holmen as Magnus
 Brede Fristad as Petter
 Elli Rhiannon Müller Osbourne as Emilie
 Solveig Koløen Birkeland as an injured girl
 Magnus Moen as Tobias
 Jenny Svennevig as Oda
 Ingeborg Enes Kjevik as Kristine
 Sorosh Sadat as Issa
 Ada Eide as Caroline
 Mariann Gjerdsbakk as Silje
 Daniel Sang Tran as Even
 Torkel Dommersnes Soldal as Herman
 Karoline Schau as Sigrid
 Tamanna Agnihotri as Halima

Reception
The critical reception of Utøya: July 22 was mostly positive. The site's critical consensus reads: "Utøya: July 22 probes a nation's lingering shock and grief with a drama that grapples with difficult themes to deeply - and appropriately - unsettling effect."

The film was selected to compete for the Golden Bear in the main competition section at the 68th Berlin International Film Festival. Utøya: July 22 received eight nominations for the 2018 Amanda Awards during the Norwegian International Film Festival in Haugesund, winning for Best Actress (Andrea Berntzen) and Best Actress in a Supporting Role (Solveig Koløen Birkeland). At the 2018 European Film Awards in Seville, Martin Otterbeck won the award for Best Cinematographer for his work on Utøya: July 22.

See also
 Arbeidernes Ungdomsfylking
 2011 Norway attacks
 Gjørv Report
List of films shot in real time
Other media based on the attack:
22 July (film), a 2018 US drama film directed by Paul Greengrass
Seconds From Disaster season 6: "Norway Massacre: I Was There" (airdate July 22, 2012)

References

External links

Official UK Trailer

2018 drama films
2018 films
2010s Norwegian-language films
Films about summer camps
Films about terrorism in Europe
Films directed by Erik Poppe
Norwegian drama films
One-shot films
Works about the 2011 Norway attacks